Dr. Abdul Haq Urdu University is a state public university established by the Government of Andhra Pradesh under A.P. State Legislature Act - 2016 located in Kurnool, Andhra Pradesh, India. The university is named after Dr. Abdul Haq, a renowned educationist and philanthropist of Rayalaseema who is the founder of Osmania College, Kurnool.

Objectives of the university
The objectives of the university are to promote and develop the Urdu language; to impart education and training in
vocational and technical subjects through the medium of Urdu; to provide wider access to people desirous of pursuing programmes of higher education and training in the Urdu medium through teaching on the campus as well as at a distance and to provide a focus on women's education.

Bilingual facility
The medium of instruction in all classes is in both Urdu and English except M.A. (Urdu).

See also
 Maulana Azad National Urdu University
 Maulana Mazharul Haque Arabic and Persian University

References

General references

Language education in India
Universities and colleges in Kurnool district
Educational institutions established in 2016
2016 establishments in Andhra Pradesh
State universities in Andhra Pradesh